Melecta separata is a species of hymenopteran in the family Apidae. It is found in North America.

Subspecies
These six subspecies belong to the species Melecta separata:
 Melecta separata alfredi (Cockerell, 1895)
 Melecta separata arizonica (Cockerell, 1902)
 Melecta separata callura (Cockerell, 1926)
 Melecta separata johnsoni (Cockerell, 1905)
 Melecta separata mojavensis Linsley, 1939
 Melecta separata separata Cresson, 1879

References

Further reading

 

Apinae
Articles created by Qbugbot
Insects described in 1879